The following is a list of home video releases from the Australian television series Prisoner (internationally re-titled Prisoner: Cell Block H in the United States and the United Kingdom, and Caged Women in Canada). The entire series, consisting of 8 seasons and 692 episodes is available in both Australia and the UK. Initially released in "Best Of" compilation format on DVD in Australia with three sets, in the United States with the first two sets, and in the United Kingdom with only the first set.

In Australia, Shock Records commenced releasing what was to be the beginning of the entire series in 2006 in volume format on DVD; the complete series over 40 volumes. Prior to the release of Volume 13, "The Complete Collection" was made available with the remaining individual volumes released subsequently. A second version of "The Complete Collection" was released in 2011. All of the original sets are now out-of-print. As of late 2016, ViaVision are releasing Prisoner on DVD in their original complete season formats.

In the United Kingdom, the series began releasing on VHS with the first 12 episodes over six videos and a video containing episodes 326 & 327. Prisoner Cell Block H DVDs have been released in stages by FremantleMedia Home Entertainment between 2008 - 2013. The content on the discs is identical to the Australian release, but with different cover/sleeve artwork. The UK releases started out as boxed sets of eight discs (32 episodes) with two discs in four cases within each set, but from Volume 4 onwards all the discs are packed into a plastic case with flip disc holders. The entire series has been released over a total of 20 volumes, the first 16 volumes featuring eight discs each but Volume 17 onwards contains ten discs.

The UK DVD releases are a combination of two volumes as released in Australia. For example, the UK Volume 1 consists of the Australian Volumes 1 and 2.

As with the Australian versions of the DVDs, the episodes are on the whole uncut, but due to the aged source of the master tapes, sometimes minor edits are made to the episodes to cover breaks in the picture or sound. "The Edna Pearson Story", released on UK DVD in February 2010, contains most of the previously cut scenes although, episode 470 is still missing a scene.

VHS

United States

The first 12 episodes of Prisoner: Cell Block H were over six VHS tapes in the United States in 1993 via MPI Home Video

United Kingdom

NTV Entertainment released eight VHS tapes between 1993 and 1995 in the United Kingdom.

 All episodes from the VHS releases have been re-rated  12  for the DVD releases in United Kingdom for violence, language, drug references, nudity, and sexual threat.

 An additional video, ″The Great Escape″, a behind-the-scenes documentary featured the ″On the Outside″ tour from 1990 and was released on 10 April 1995.

DVD

In North America, Some of the episodes of this soap drama cult classic series were released on Region 1 DVD by A&E Home Entertainment, under licence from FremantleMedia International through the Reg Grundy Organisation from 2004-2007.

Compilation releases

{| class="wikitable" style="width:95%; text-align:center;"
|-
! rowspan="2"|Title
! colspan="3"|Initial release
! rowspan="2"|Episodes
! rowspan="2"|No. of discs
! rowspan="2"|Additional information
|-
!Region 1
!Region 2
!Region 4
|-
| The Best Of (1)
| 30 November 2004
| 22 September 2003
| 18 February 2002
| 12
| 3
|

|-
| The Best Of (2)
| 19 December 2006
| 
| 24 February 2003
| 12
| 3
|

|-
| The Best Of (3)
| 
| 
| 26 July 2004
| 12
| 3
|
{{Hidden||

 Disc 1 - Ann and Meg's Kidnapping: episodes 498,499,500 & 501
 Disc 2 - Rita at Blackmoor: episodes 664,665,666 & 667
 Disc 3 - Lead Up to the Final: episodes 687,688,689 & 690
 Also released on VHS format in Australia
 Special Features:
 On the Inside documentary
Ratings:
 M (Australia)
}}
|-
| The Edna Pearson Story| 
| 8 February 2010
| 
| 8
| 2
|

|}

Region 4Prisoner is rated  M  (recommended for mature audiences) for moderate themes, violence, moderate violence, infrequent moderate violence, drug references, moderate drug references, moderate drug use, moderate drug themes and coarse language.

Volume sets

Complete season sets

In late 2016, Australian distribution company ViaVision commenced releasing the series in their complete season formats on DVD and is under its original title of Prisoner as opposed to the Region 4 volume sets which contained the international title Prisoner: Cell Block H. 

Collection sets

Region 2
In the United Kingdom, Prisoner: Cell Block H'' was released via Fremantle Home Entertainment, beginning late 2008. The complete series was released through 20 volumes containing 32 episodes per set for the first sixteen volumes; Volume 17 contains 40 episodes, Volume 18 and Volume 19 both contain 48 episodes and the final volume contains 44 episodes. The reason for the increased number of episodes on later sets was due to the fact that Fremantle wanted to keep exactly double the number of episodes as the original Australian sets. The first 33 Australian releases contain 16 episodes per set; sets 34 to 39 containing 24 episodes per set and Volume 40 containing 20 episodes. Therefore, Fremantle in the UK doubled-up on episodes so that they could finish releasing by Volume 20.

In Australia, distribution company Shock Records began releasing the UK volumes in 2011, as their original volumes are now out of print. The final volume was released in early 2014.

References

External links

 .
 On the Inside – Official Fan Club. 
 Encyclopedia of Television
 Prisoner at the National Film and Sound Archive

Prisoner